Le5 may refer to:

 LE-5, a model of liquid rocket engine
 Le5 Communications, a Canadian radio broadcasting company
 LE5 Engine, model number of a 2.4 L General Motors Ecotec Internal Combustion Engine